Ana María Catalá Fernández (born 20 July 1993), also known as Anama, is a Spanish footballer who plays as a defender for Rayo Vallecano.

Personal life
Catalá initially played football from the age of six during school breaks and has experienced sexism as a female footballer. Outside of her football career, she studies at the School of Physical Activity and Sport Sciences (INEF).

Playing career
Catalá scored the decisive penalty for Spain in the shootout of the 2010 U-17 European Championship final against Ireland.

In June 2020, Madrid CFF announced the departures of 12 players, including Catalá. In October 2020, it was announced that she would join Rayo Vallecano, the club that she had previously left to join Madrid CFF in the summer of 2016.

References

External links
 
 Profile at aupaAthletic.com 

1993 births
Living people
Spanish women's footballers
Primera División (women) players
Rayo Vallecano Femenino players
Footballers from the Community of Madrid
Madrid CFF players
Women's association football defenders
Spain women's youth international footballers